Streptomyces prasinosporus is a green-spored bacterium species from the genus of Streptomyces which has been isolated from soil in India.

See also 
 List of Streptomyces species

References

Further reading

External links
Type strain of Streptomyces prasinosporus at BacDive -  the Bacterial Diversity Metadatabase

prasinosporus
Bacteria described in 1966